The Willis–Punch ministry or Willis ministry was the 70th ministry of the New South Wales Government, and was led by the 34th Premier of New South Wales, Sir Eric Willis in a Liberal Party coalition with the Country Party of Australia, that was led by Leon Punch.

Background
Willis joined the newly formed Liberal Party of Australia in 1945, after hearing a speech by Sir Robert Menzies. After unsuccessfully seeking election to the Australian House of Representatives, Willis was elected to the New South Wales Legislative Assembly in 1950 and served continuously up until 1978, representing the seat of Earlwood, in the inner southwestern suburbs of Sydney. Upon Sir Robert Askin's retirement in January 1975, Willis was seen as the favourite to take the premiership. However, despite Askin's initial support, Willis refused his help, preferring to gain the leadership on his own merits. Askin then put his support behind the Minister for Lands, Tom Lewis. Willis, sure he had support, refused to campaign, and the party put its support behind Lewis, leading to his election to Premier. Willis was then replaced as Deputy by John Maddison. For Willis' service as Deputy Leader he was appointed a Knight Commander of the Order of the British Empire on 14 June 1975. Lewis was Premier for only one year and looked increasingly likely to lead the state Liberals to defeat. At the party room meeting on 20 January 1976, parliamentary backbencher Neil Pickard called a spill motion. This was carried 22 votes to 11 and Willis was made Leader unopposed.

Punch was elected to the NSW Legislative Assembly in 1959 and served continuously up until 1985, representing variously the seats of Upper Hunter (1959-1962) and then Gloucester (1962-1985). Elected Deputy Leader of the Country Party in 1973, Punch was elected as leader of his party following the retirement and resignation of the  Sir Charles Cutler in December 1975.

Composition of ministry
The ministry was sworn in by the Lieutenant Governor Sir Laurence Street on 23 January 1976, a few days after Willis deposed Tom Lewis in a spill motion for the leadership of the parliamentary branch of the Liberal Party in New South Wales. It ended on 14 May 1976 when the coalition was defeated at the 1976 election by the Labor Party and the First Wran ministry was sworn in.

 
Ministers are members of the Legislative Assembly unless otherwise noted.

See also

Members of the New South Wales Legislative Assembly, 1973–1976
Members of the New South Wales Legislative Council, 1973–1976

Notes

References

 

New South Wales ministries
1976 establishments in Australia
1976 disestablishments in Australia